USS Halibut has been the name of more than one United States Navy ship, and may refer to:  

, a submarine in commission from 1942 to 1945
, later SSN-587, a submarine in commission from 1960 to 1976

United States Navy ship names